Abigail Mackenzie Smith (born October 4, 1993) is an American soccer player who plays as a goalkeeper for NJ/NY Gotham FC in the NWSL. She has represented the United States on the under-17, under-20, under-23 and senior national teams.

Early life 
Raised in Plano, Texas, Abby attended Plano West High School. She was the starting goalkeeper on the girls' soccer team before graduating a semester early to facilitate travel with the national team. Smith began playing soccer in elementary school. She played club soccer for the Dallas Texans 94 Red Soccer Club from 2005 to 2012. During the 2011–12 season, the team ranked first nationally in the ESPNHS Elite Clubs National League. She captained the team for four years and helped the team win the Nike Cup in Portland, Oregon and Gothia Cup in Gothenburg Sweden in 2008 as well as the US Youth Soccer (USYS) Region III championship finals in 2009.  In 2009, Abby earned the USYS ODP National Championship Golden Glove. She was twice named a National Soccer Coaches Association of America Youth All-America honoree in 2010 and 2011 and was named Parade Magazine All-American in 2010.

Smith participated in the Olympic Development Program (ODP) from 2005 to 2010 and was a member of the Region III ODP Team. Top Drawer Soccer ranked her as the 13th-best player in the United States and the second-best player in Texas. ESPNHS ranked her fifth in college prospects across the nation.

College

University of Texas Longhorns 2012–2015
Smith attended the University of Texas where she played for the Texas Longhorns from 2012 to 2015. During her freshman year, she was the starting goalkeeper in the last 12 matches of the season allowing 8 goals and making 34 saves. She set a new record for a Texas rookie goalkeeper for lowest goals-against average at 0.63 – last set in 2001 and tied the school record for shutouts by a freshman with seven. Smith's .810 save percentage ranked first in the Big 12 Conference and second in overall goals against average (GAA). Smith helped lead a defensive line that tied the regular season record for fewest goals allowed (five) in the Big 12 Conference. She was named the Soccer America Goalkeeper of the Week following a 1–0 shutout against Oklahoma State on October 5, 2012.

During her sophomore season, Smith was the starting goalkeeper in all 20 matches and scored her first career goal. With a 12–6–2 overall record, she recorded a 0.78 goals-against average (GAA) and made 72 saves with eight shutouts. She was named Big 12 Conference Defensive Player of the Week on September 10 after helping defeat Samford University and Illinois State University as well as making a game-saving penalty kick stop in the 87th minute of one of the matches. She scored her first career goal off a 50-yard free kick. In 2014, Smith recorded nine shutouts tying the school record for the most in a single season. Her 24 career shutouts ranked second in school history. She was named to the All Big-12 Conference first team. Smith finished her junior season with a 0.92 GAA and her 98 saves ranked first in the Big 12 Conference.

During her senior season, Smith was a national finalist for the 2015 Senior Class Award and was named to the All-Big 12 Conference First-Team Academic team. She was named ESPNW Player of the Week for week 9 on October 21, 2015 and Big 12 Defensive Player of the Week twice in October. Smith ranked first in the Big 12 Conference for total saves with 96 and saves-per-match with 5.33. Her 30th career shutout on October 30 set a new school career shutout record. She scored her third career goal (a game-winner) on a 90-plus-yard punt against the University of Miami.

Club career

Boston Breakers 
Smith was drafted by Boston Breakers in the third round of the 2016 NWSL College Draft. She signed with Boston in April 2016. Smith suffered a season-ending right knee injury during the second game of the season in May 2016.

Smith rehabilitated during the offseason and won the starting job at the beginning of the 2017 season. In June 2017, she required a platelet-rich plasma injection in her previously injured knee, forcing her to miss time, but she still appeared in 19 games for the Breakers.

Utah Royals 
After the Boston Breakers folded prior to the 2018 NWSL season, Smith was selected by the Utah Royals with the 5th pick in the Breakers Dispersal Draft on January 30, 2018. Smith appeared in 17 games for the Royals in 2018. She signed a new contract with the team prior to the 2019 season.

KC NWSL 
After the Utah Royals were sold before the 2021 season, Smith and the rest of the formal Royals were transferred to KC NWSL. She split time with Nicole Barnhart until Barnhart was released and Smith was traded to the Portland Thorns in return for AD Franch.

Portland Thorns FC 
Smith saw no action with the Portland Thorns in the 2021 season.

International career
Smith has represented the United States on the under-17, under-20, and under-23 national teams. In May 2017, she was called up to the USWNT for friendlies against Sweden and Norway but did not appear in either match.

Honors 
Portland Thorns FC

 NWSL Championship: 2022

References

External links 

 US Soccer player profile
 Boston Breakers player profile
 Texas player profile

1993 births
Living people
American women's soccer players
Texas Longhorns women's soccer players
Boston Breakers players
National Women's Soccer League players
Soccer players from Portland, Oregon
Soccer players from Texas
Sportspeople from Plano, Texas
Boston Breakers draft picks
United States women's under-20 international soccer players
Utah Royals FC players
Women's association football goalkeepers
Kansas City Current players
African-American women's soccer players
21st-century African-American sportspeople
21st-century African-American women
Portland Thorns FC players